Abel Eduardo Balbo (born 1 June 1966) is an Argentine football manager and former player who played as a striker.

Balbo played for various clubs in Argentina and Italy during the course of his career. He was also an Argentine international.

Club career
Balbo was born in Empalme Villa Constitución, Santa Fe.

At club level, Balbo played for Newell's Old Boys (1987–88), River Plate (1988–89), before moving to Italy and Udinese (1989–93), Roma (1993–98 and 2000–02), Parma (1998–99), and Fiorentina. He played four games for Boca Juniors before finally retiring. He scored a total of 138 goals in Serie A; his best seasons came in 1992–93 for Udinese and 1994–95 for Roma, with 22 goals in each of them.

In 2000, Roma paid Fiorentina 1.75 billion Italian lire to re-sign him and offered him a two-year contract with 1.7 billion annual salary before tax.

International career
For Argentina, Balbo scored 11 goals in 37 caps, and played at the 1990, the 1994, the 1998 FIFA World Cups, the 1989 and 1995 Copas América. In the 1995 tournament in Uruguay, Balbo partnered Gabriel Batistuta in attack, and scored a goal against Brazil's Claudio Taffarel in an infamous quarter-final game that Argentina eventually lost in a penalty shootout after Brazilian striker Tulio Costa scored the Brazilian equalizer with 10 minutes to go – after clearly controlling the ball with his arm.

Post-retirement and coaching
After his retirement, Balbo eventually became a musician, performing songs in Italian and Spanish. He took his UEFA Pro coaching badges in 2007, and currently works as a football commentator for RAI Radio1.

In February 2009 he took his first head coaching job, succeeding to Luca Gotti as manager of bottom-table Serie B club Treviso. He resigned only a few rounds later, on 18 March, after having achieved only one point in four games, citing lack of professionalism and organizational issues as the main reasons for his choice to step down as Treviso manager.

In November 2010 he was appointed as new technical area coordinator and assistant coach of Serie D club Atletico Arezzo until the end of the season.

In the season 2012–13 he coached the Serie D club Arezzo from the start of the season until 30 October 2012, when he left by mutual consent with the club. He successively worked as football commentator for Italian public broadcasting group RAI.

In June 2022, after almost ten years without a coaching job, Balbo moved back to Argentina to accept the managerial position at Argentine Primera División club Central Córdoba (SdE). On 20 October, after guiding his club to safety in the 2022 Argentine Primera División, Central Córdoba announced the departure of Balbo by the end of the season.

On 22 October 2022, Balbo took over fellow top tier side Estudiantes de La Plata.

Style of play
Described as "an authentic centre-forward," by Il Corriere dello Sport in 2019, Balbo was a physically strong forward, with good feet and a powerful shot, who was renowned for his composure in front of goal and his efficient playing style. He was mainly known for his eye for goal and his movement, in particular inside the penalty area, which also made him a threat on counter–attacks; he also excelled in the air. In addition to his playing ability, he was also known to be a correct player.

Personal life
Abel Balbo is married and a practising Roman Catholic.

Career statistics

Club

1 Includes 1 appearance and 1 goal in the Serie B Relegation tie-breaker for the 1992–93 Serie A season.
2 Includes 1 appearance in the 2001 Supercoppa Italiana.

International
Source:

Honours

Club
Newell's Old Boys
 Argentine Primera División: 1987–88

Parma
 Coppa Italia: 1998–99
 UEFA Cup: 1998–99

Roma
 Serie A: 2000–01
 Supercoppa Italiana: 2001

International
Argentina
 FIFA World Cup: 1990 runner-up
 Copa América: 1989 bronze medalist

Individual
 Serie B Top-Scorer: 1990–91 (22 goals, with Udinese)

References

External links

  
 

1966 births
Living people
People from Constitución Department
Argentine people of Italian descent
Association football forwards
Argentine footballers
Argentine Roman Catholics
Newell's Old Boys footballers
Club Atlético River Plate footballers
Udinese Calcio players
A.S. Roma players
Parma Calcio 1913 players
ACF Fiorentina players
Serie A players
Serie B players
Boca Juniors footballers
Argentine football managers
S.S. Arezzo managers
Treviso F.B.C. 1993 managers
Estudiantes de La Plata managers
1990 FIFA World Cup players
1994 FIFA World Cup players
1998 FIFA World Cup players
1989 Copa América players
1995 Copa América players
Argentina international footballers
Argentine expatriate footballers
Argentine Primera División players
Argentine expatriate sportspeople in Italy
UEFA Cup winning players
Expatriate football managers in Italy
Expatriate footballers in Italy
Sportspeople from Santa Fe Province
Central Córdoba de Santiago del Estero managers